The 1999 Heineken Trophy women's singles was the women's singles event of the tenth edition of the Rosmalen Grass Court Championships, a WTA Tier III tournament held in 's-Hertogenbosch, Netherlands and part of the European grass court season. Sabine Appelmans and Miriam Oremans were the defending champions and third seed, but they were defeated in the first round by Sandra Kleinová and Magdalena Maleeva.

Italians Silvia Farina and Rita Grande won in the final 7–5, 7–6(7–2) against Cara Black and Kristie Boogert.

Seeds

Draw

References
 ITF doubles results page

Doubles
Heineken Trophy - Doubles